Robert "Bingo" Smith (born February 26, 1946) is an American retired professional basketball player. He played for the San Diego Rockets, the Cleveland Cavaliers, and the San Diego Clippers.

College career
Smith played for the Tulsa Golden Hurricane. It was there where he got his nickname of Bingo to differentiate from the other two Bobby Smiths on the team.

Playing career
With the sixth pick in the first round of the 1969 NBA draft, the San Diego Rockets selected Smith. A year later, he was drafted by the Cleveland Cavaliers in the 1970 Expansion Draft. In his first game with the team, he scored 21 points. He helped contribute to the Cavaliers winning the NBA Central Division title in 1976, and was part of the Miracle of Richfield, winning Game 2 of the Semifinals vs the Washington Bullets.

In 11 seasons, Smith played in 865 games and logged 22,407 minutes. Smith was especially noted for his ability to hit jump shots from long range.  His outside jump shots, often were taken from today's 3 point range. For his career, he recorded a .449 field goal percentage (4,776 FGs made out of 10,642 attempts). Smith also had a .798 free throw rate (1,307-of-1,637) and also accounted for 3,630 total rebounds, 1,734 assists and 10,882 points. Smith was known for his rainbow jumper, now utilized by other forwards such as Dirk Nowitzki.

His best season was in 1974, when he scored 15.9 points per game and had a .483 field goal percentage.

He played the full 82 games in four of his seasons, but he also led the league in turnovers percentage in his final three seasons. He scored his 10,000th point in the middle of the 1979 season.

On October 27, 1979, he was traded for a 3rd round draft pick (used to pick Stuart House) to the San Diego Clippers. Oddly enough, the Cavaliers retired his number over a month later, while he was still playing with the Clippers. Fittingly, he ended his career in the same place it had started. After one season (the first year that the three point line was instituted), he was drafted by the Dallas Mavericks in 1980 Expansion Draft, but he never played for them, retiring at the age of 34.

Smith was inducted into the University of Tulsa Athletics Hall of Fame in 1984. His number 7 has been retired by the Cleveland Cavaliers.

He is third all time in games played with the Cavaliers, fifth in minutes played, sixth in points, third in field goal and field goal attempts, and third in turnover percentage.

On April 1, 2009, Smith suffered a stroke, which he is still recovering from. He is divorced, and has five children, five grandchildren and two great-grandchildren.

He is a member of the 2016 class of the Ohio Basketball Hall of Fame. In 2020, Tulsa retired Smith’s number 32.

NBA career statistics

Regular season

|-
| style="text-align:left;"|
| style="text-align:left;"|San Diego
| 75 ||  || 16.0 || .427 ||  || .688 || 4.4 || 1.0 ||   ||   || 7.3
|-
| style="text-align:left;"|
| style="text-align:left;"| Cleveland
| 77 ||  || 30.3 || .448 ||  || .761 || 5.6 || 3.4 ||   ||   || 15.2
|-
| style="text-align:left;"|
| style="text-align:left;"|Cleveland
| 82 ||  || 33.3 || .443 ||  || .795 || 6.1 || 3.0 ||   ||   || 15.0
|-
| style="text-align:left;"|
| style="text-align:left;"|Cleveland
| 73 ||  || 14.6 || .444 ||  || .790 || 2.7 || 1.5 ||   ||   || 8.2
|-
| style="text-align:left;"|
| style="text-align:left;"|Cleveland
| 82 ||  || 31.9 || .443 ||  || .822 || 5.3 || 2.4 || 1.1 || .4 || 14.8
|-
| style="text-align:left;"|
| style="text-align:left;"|Cleveland
| 82 ||  || 32.1 || .483 ||  || .825 || 5.0 || 2.8 || 1.0 || .3 || 15.9
|-
| style="text-align:left;"|
| style="text-align:left;"|Cleveland
| 81 ||  || 28.9 || .442 ||  || .816 || 4.2 || 1.9 || .7 || .4 || 13.6
|-
| style="text-align:left;"|
| style="text-align:left;"|Cleveland
| 81 ||  || 26.4 || .446 ||  || .818 || 3.9 || 1.9 || .8 || .4 || 14.5
|-
| style="text-align:left;"|
| style="text-align:left;"|Cleveland
| 82 ||  || 19.3 || .439 ||  || .800 || 2.5 || 1.1 || .5 || .3 || 10.3
|-
| style="text-align:left;"|
| style="text-align:left;"|Cleveland
| 72 ||  || 22.9 || .460 ||  || .783 || 2.9 || 1.7 || .6 || .1 || 11.2
|-
| style="text-align:left;" rowspan="2"|
| style="text-align:left;"|Cleveland
| 8 ||  || 16.9 || .458 || .200 || .875 || 1.8 || .9 || .4 || .3 || 9.3
|-
| style="text-align:left;"|San Diego
| 70 ||  || 28.4 || .430 || .289 || .869 || 3.5 || 1.3 || .8 || .2 || 11.7
|- class="sortbottom"
| style="text-align:center;" colspan=2|Career 
| 865 ||  || 25.9 || .449 || .284 || .798 || 4.2 || 2.0 || .8 || .3 || 12.6
|- class="sortbottom"

Playoffs 

|-
| style="text-align:left;"|1976
|style="text-align:left;"|Cleveland
|13||||29.2||.433||||.880||3.3||2.3||.8||.2||12.6
|-
| style="text-align:left;"|1977
|style="text-align:left;"|Cleveland
|3||||19.0||.231||||1.000||2.7||1.3||1.0||.3||7.0
|-
| style="text-align:left;|1978
|style="text-align:left;"|Cleveland
|2||||17.0||.615||||||1.5||.5||.5||.0||8.0
|-
| style="text-align:center;" colspan="2"| Career
| 18 ||  || 26.1 || .407 ||  || .893 || 3.0 || 1.9 || .8 || .2 || 11.2

References

External links
Career Stats

1946 births
Living people
20th-century African-American sportspeople
21st-century African-American people
African-American basketball players
All-American college men's basketball players
American men's basketball players
Basketball players from Memphis, Tennessee
Cleveland Cavaliers expansion draft picks
Cleveland Cavaliers players
Dallas Mavericks expansion draft picks
Los Angeles Stars draft picks
National Basketball Association players with retired numbers
San Diego Clippers players
San Diego Rockets draft picks
San Diego Rockets players
Shooting guards
Small forwards
Tulsa Golden Hurricane men's basketball players